is a Japanese footballer who plays for Thespakusatsu Gunma.

Club statistics
Updated to 1 January 2019.

References

External links

Profile at Thespakusatsu Gunma 

1992 births
Living people
Komazawa University alumni
Association football people from Gunma Prefecture
Japanese footballers
J2 League players
J3 League players
Thespakusatsu Gunma players
Association football defenders